Textual scholarship (or textual studies) is an umbrella term for disciplines that deal with describing, transcribing, editing or annotating texts and physical documents.

Overview
Textual research is mainly historically oriented. Textual scholars study, for instance, how writing practices and printing technology have developed, how a certain writer has written and revised his or her texts, how literary documents have been edited, the history of reading culture, as well as censorship and the authenticity of texts. The subjects, methods and theoretical backgrounds of textual research vary widely, but what they have in common is an interest in the genesis and derivation of texts and textual variation in these practices.

Many textual scholars are interested in author intention while others seek to see how text is transmitted. Textual scholars often produce their own editions of what they discovered.

Disciplines of textual scholarship include, among others, textual criticism, stemmatology, paleography, genetic criticism, bibliography and history of the book. Textual scholar David Greetham has described textual scholarship as a term encompassing "the procedures of enumerative bibliographers, descriptive, analytical, and historical bibliographers, paleographers and codicologists, textual editors, and annotators-cumulatively and collectively". Some disciplines of textual scholarship focus on certain material sources or text genres, such as epigraphy, codicology and diplomatics.

The historical roots of textual scholarship date back to the 3rd century BCE, when the scholarly activities of copying, comparing, describing and archiving texts became professionalized in the Library of Alexandria.

See also
 Text publication society

References

Further reading

External links 
 The Society for Textual Scholarship
 The European Society for Textual Scholarship (ESTS)

 
Academic disciplines